Callosobruchus gibbicollis, is a species of leaf beetle found in Sri Lanka.

Description
Body red in color. Body vestiture is white and moderately dense. Antennae, mid legs and hind legs are yellowish red. It is characterized by strongly developed pronotal gibbosity. Pronotum conical. Pygidium is extremely convex and covered with white hairs. Metathorax and mesothorax are blackish. Seutellum quadrate. Elytral suture is brownish. Lateral spots in pronotum and hind femora are brownish.

References 

Bruchinae
Insects of Sri Lanka
Beetles described in 1984